The 2010 8 Hours of Le Castellet (8 Heures du Castellet) was the inaugural round of the 2010 Le Mans Series season.  It took place at the Circuit Paul Ricard, Le Castellet, France on 11 April 2010.  It was the first Le Mans Series race that is longer than the standard 1,000-km distance the LMS use since the 2007 Mil Milhas Brasil.  Audi Sport Team Joest won the race overall in their first use of the Audi R15 TDI in the Le Mans Series, with drivers Allan McNish and Rinaldo Capello.  Aston Martin Racing and Rebellion Racing completed the overall podium five laps behind the winning Audi.  Strakka Racing also brought Honda Performance Development a win on their debut in the LMP2 category, leading the OAK Racing Pescarolo by 33 seconds.  Applewood Seven won the Formula Le Mans category, the first event in which this class participated in the Le Mans Series.  Team Felbermayr-Proton dominated the GT2 category by finishing in the top two positions, ahead of the first of the AF Corse Ferraris.

Qualifying
Qualifying saw Oreca take pole position in their first outing with their new Peugeot 908 HDi FAP, beating the factory Audi R15 TDI by 0.4 seconds. Strakka Racing had a similar story taking LMP2 pole in their first outing with their HPD ARX-01C. They qualified two seconds before the next nearest car, the Quifel Ginetta-Zytek. AF Corse took GT2 pole and DAMS took the first pole position in Le Mans Series history in the new Formula Le Mans class.

Qualifying result
Pole position winners in each class are marked in bold.

Race

Race result
Class winners in bold.  Cars failing to complete 70% of winner's distance marked as Not Classified (NC).

References

External links
 Le Mans Series - 8 Heures du Castellet

Castellet
6 Hours of Castellet
Eight hours
April 2010 sports events in France